Felix Heuertz (born 20 March 1935) is a Luxembourgian sprinter. He competed in the men's 400 metres at the 1960 Summer Olympics.

References

1935 births
Living people
Athletes (track and field) at the 1960 Summer Olympics
Luxembourgian male sprinters
Olympic athletes of Luxembourg
Place of birth missing (living people)